Hjordkær Parish is a parish in the Diocese of Haderslev in Aabenraa Municipality, Denmark. Hjordkær Church is located in the village of Hjordkær, the largest town of the parish.

References

External links
 The church website

Parishes in Aabenraa Municipality
Parishes of Denmark